Mister Supranational 2022 was the 6th edition of the Mister Supranational, held on July 16, 2022 at Strzelecki Park Amphitheater in Nowy Sącz, Poland. Varo Vargas of Peru crowned Luis Daniel Gálvez of Cuba at the end of the event.

Background

Location and date 
On 26 April 2022, Gerhard Parzutka von Lipinski, the president of Miss and Mister Supranational, announced that 13th edition of the Miss Supranational competition will return to Nowy Sacz in the Małopolska region this June and July, the final night will be held on July 15, 2022.

Presenters 
Anita Nneka Jones returned as host and joined by Martin Fitch, with backstage coverage by Ivan Podrez. 
Ivan Podrez, presenter of the Mister Supranational challenges
Anita Nneka Jones, presenter for Sky News, BBC Radio London and Premier League
Martin Fitch, presenter and actor

Panel of Experts 
The Preliminary Competition was broadcast live on the official Mister Supranational YouTube channel at 11pm CET on July 12, 2022. Panel of Experts were announced.

Anntonia Porsild – Miss Supranational 2019 from Thailand
Varo Vargas – Mister Supranational 2021 from Peru
Gerhard Patzutka Von Lipinski – President of the Nowa Scena organisation (only on the final telecast)
Katarzyna Krzeszowska – Miss Polski 2012 from Poland (only on the final telecast)
Lalela Mswane – Miss Supranational 2022 from South Africa (only on the final telecast)
Magda Karwacka , TV presenter from Poland (only on the final telecast)
Marzena Rogalska, Model and TV presenter from Poland (only on the final telecast)
Mateusz Nowogrodzki , President of Jubiler Schubert from Poland (only on the final telecast)
Andre Sleigh – Creative Director of the Miss and Mister Supranational (only as preliminary judge)
Chanique Rabe – Miss Supranational 2021 from Namibia (only as preliminary judge)
Eoanna Constanza – Miss Supranational 2021 4th Runner-up from Dominican Republic (only as preliminary judge)
Valentina Sánchez – Miss Supranational 2021 3rd Runner-up from Venezuela (only as preliminary judge)
Valeria Vazquez Latorre – Miss Supranational 2018 from Puerto Rico and ambassador for Jubiler Schubert (only as preliminary judge)

Results

Placements 

Notes:
§ – placed into the Top 10 by fan-voting challenge
Δ – placed into the Top 20 by fast-track challenges

Order of announcements

Top 20

Top 10

Top 5

Special awards

Challenge events

Supra Fan-Vote 
The winner of the Supra Fan Vote will automatically advance to the Top 10 finalists of Mister Supranational 2022.

Supra Influencer 
The winner of the Supra Influencer will automatically advance to the Top 20 finalists of Mister Supranational 2022.

Supra Chat

Round 1
Supra Chat with MISTERS 2022 Episode 1 premiered on Mister Supranational official YouTube channel on Jun 22, 2022.

Note:  wasn't assigned to any group for the Supra Chat.

Final Result
The Final premiered via Mister Supranational YouTube channel on July 14, 2022. The winner of Supra Chat will automatically advance to the Top 20 semifinalists of Mister Supranational 2022.

Note:  officially withdrew from competition.

Top Model 
The Top Model event was held on July 8, 2022. The delayed competition broadcast was officially premiered via the Mister Supranational YouTube channel on July 9, 2022. The winner of Top Model will automatically advance to the Top 20 semifinalists of Mister Supranational 2022.

Non-Fast Track Events

Talent 
Talent finalists were announced via Mister Supranational official Instagram account and was held on July 11, 2022. The delayed broadcast of the competition were official premiered via Mister Supranational YouTube channel on July 15, 2022.

Contestants 
Contestants were officially confirmed to compete for Mister Supranational 2022 during The Sashing Ceremony which was broadcast live from Nowy Sącz, Malopolska via Mister Supranational official YouTube on July 6, 2022.

Notes

Debuts

Returns
Last competed in 2017:
 

Last competed in 2018:
 
 

Last competed in 2019:

Withdrawals
 
 
 
 
 
 
  - Alhassan Dumbuya took part in Episode 5 of Supra Chat with Misters 2022 with no show in Poland.
 
  - Michal Hlinka took part in Episode 3 of Supra Chat with Misters 2022 with no show in Poland.
 
 
  - Tatenda Njaniketook was named one of the winners in Episode 5 of Supra Chat with Misters 2022 with no show in Poland.

References

External links 
 

2022
2022 beauty pageants